Romanoa is a genus of fungi within the Clavicipitaceae family. This is a monotypic genus, containing the single species Romanoa terricola. The genus name Romanoa is also used for a plant.

References

External links
Index Fungorum

Monotypic Sordariomycetes genera
Clavicipitaceae